The Ides of March is a 1961 Australian television play. Director William Sterling said it was a more impressionistic production than the usual television drama.

Premise
A fantastia  on certain events and persons in the last days of the Roman Republic.

Cast
Brian James as Caesar
Lynn Flanagan as Claudia
Bruce Barry as Brutus
Edward Brayshaw as Catullus
Don Crosby as Cassius
Keith Dare as Casca
Edward Howell as Decius
Fay Kelton as Pompeia
Kevin McBeath as Cicero
David Mitchell as Clodius
Dennis Mitchell as Marc Antony
Carole Potter as Cleopatra

Production
William Sterling said:
There is no beginning, middle or end in the recognised manner. Rather the treatment will be impressionistic and sstylised with much of the action mimed by the characters to prerecorded speech. The form of the novel is followed closely and the TV screen can 'picture' the thoughts of the principal characters as well as illustrating the events that have provoked these thoughts.  There will be dialogue scenes as well but the play concentrates on centralising the character of Caesar against a vast background canvas that recreates the turbulent of the first century of Rome.
More than 500 yards of material were used to make 24 costumes, five for Cleopatra.

Reception
The TV critic from the Sydney Morning Herald thought "nothing could have seemed less promising" than an adaptation of the novel, which did not seem suited to television, but "the results were surprisingly successful" praising the writing and direction.

References

External links
 The Ides of March at IMDb

Australian television films
Films directed by William Sterling (director)